Stars of the Russian Ballet is a 1953 Soviet ballet film trilogy, featuring abridged versions of Swan Lake, The Fountain of Bakhchisarai and Flames of Paris.  The film headlined world-renowned ballerinas Maya Plisetskaya and Galina Ulanova, and was directed by Gerbert Rappaport. It was entered into the 1954 Cannes Film Festival.

Cast
 Galina Ulanova as Maria (segment "The Fountain of Bakhchisarai")
 Konstantin Sergeyev as Prince Siegfried (segment "Swan Lake")
 Natalya Dudinskaya as Odile, the black swan (segment "Swan Lake")
 V. Bakanov as Rothbart (segment "Swan Lake")
 Pyotr Gussyev as Girai (segment "The Fountain of Bakhchisarai")
 Maya Plisetskaya as Zarema (segment "The Fountain of Bakhchisarai")
 Yuri Zhdanov as Vacelev (segment "The Fountain of Bakhchisarai")
 Vakhtang Chabukiani as Philippe (segment "The Flames of Paris")
 Muza Gotlib as Jeanne (segment "The Flames of Paris")

References

External links

1953 films
1953 musical films
Soviet ballet films
Films directed by Herbert Rappaport
Soviet anthology films
Soviet musical films